MCB Group Limited is a financial services holding company. Its headquarters is located in Port Louis, Mauritius, with subsidiaries and investments in Mauritius, France, India, Madagascar, Maldives, Mayotte, Mozambique, Réunion, Seychelles and South Africa.

Overview 
MCB Group is a large financial services conglomerate. As of 31 March 2015, it had an estimated asset base of over US$7.4 billion (MUR 267.7 billion) and estimated shareholders' equity of more than US$1.0 billion (MUR 35.2 billion).

The group is listed as one of the top 10 companies listed on the Stock Exchange of Mauritius in terms of annualized returns. A 2015 report by Business Magazine indicated that the MCB Group was the most valuable company in the Eastern Africa and the Indian Ocean region in terms of market value and was the most profitable company in Mauritius.

History 
MCB Group Ltd was incorporated on 5 August 2013 during the corporate restructure of Mauritius Commercial Bank (MCB). Previously, MCB operated as both a listed company and a holding company. MCB Group was created by MCB's shareholder with the aim of separate the banking and non-banking operations and raise capital in order to position itself for future growth.

During the restructure, shareholders of MCB exchanged their MCB shares for MCB Group shares on a 1:1 ratio and the various subsidiaries previously held by Mauritius Commercial Bank were unbundled to MCB Group. Its shares were then listed on the Stock Exchange of Mauritius on April 5, 2014 to replace those of Mauritius Commercial Bank on the Mauritian bourse.

Member companies 
The companies that compose the MCB Group include but are not limited to the following:

Banking operations 
 MCB Investment Holding Limited – Port Louis, Mauritius – 100% Shareholding – Intermediary holding company of all of the Group's banking businesses.
 The Mauritius Commercial Bank Ltd – Port Louis, Mauritius – 100% Shareholding – A commercial bank in Mauritius, serving individuals and businesses, focusing mainly on large corporations. Incorporated in 1838 and the group's flagship company.
 MCB Seychelles – Victoria, Seychelles – 100% Shareholding – A commercial bank in Seychelles.
 MCB Moçambique – Maputo, Mozambique – 95% Shareholding – A commercial bank in Mozambique.
 MCB Madagascar – Antananarivo, Madagascar – 85% Shareholding – A commercial bank in Madagascar.
 MCB Maldives – Malé, Maldives – 100% Shareholding – A commercial bank in Maldives.
 Banque Française Commerciale Océan Indien (BFCOI)– Paris, France – 49.99% Shareholding – BFCOI is a joint venture between MCB Group and Société Générale. The bank has operations in France and the French Overseas departments of Mayotte and Réunion.

Non-banking financial 
 MCB Capital Markets – 100% Shareholding – A leading financial services Investment holding company in Mauritius. Providing financial services through its subsidiaries:
 MCB Investment Services 
 MCB Registry & Securities
 MCB Stockbrokers
 MCB Capital Partners
 MCB Investment Management
 MCB Structured Solutions
 MCB Equity Fund – 100% Shareholding – A private equity fund which specializes in providing expansion and buy-out capital to small and medium-sized established businesses across Eastern and Sub-Saharan Africa.
 MCB Factors – 100% Shareholding – Offering invoice discounting services.
 Credit Guarantee Insurance Company – Port Louis, Mauritius – 40% Shareholding – A joint venture with La Prudence Holding, providing credit insurance services to its customers by ensuring protection in respect of their trade receivables.
All the Non-banking financial investments are based in  Port Louis, Mauritius.

Other investments 
 Fincorp Investment Limited – 57.56% Shareholding – Holding company quoted on the Stock Exchange of Mauritius. Its subsidiaries include: 
 MCB Leasing – the leasing arm of MCB Group and a fully owned subsidiary of Fincorp Investment
 Promotion and Development –  A quoted company having diversified interests
 MCB Properties – 100% Shareholding – The company owns several properties, some of which house banking premises of MCB Limited.
 MCB Forward Foundation – 100% Shareholding – The MCB Forward Foundation manages the Corporate Social Responsibility (CSR) activities of the Group.
 Blue Penny Museum – 97.88% Shareholding – The Blue Penny Museum is an art and history museum that is wholly devoted to Mauritius.
 MCB Consulting Services – 100% Shareholding – The dedicated consulting arm of the Group.
 Compagnie des Villages de Vacances de l’Isle de France Limitée (COVIFRA) - 84.4% Shareholding - Hotel property holding company quoted on the Stock Exchange of Mauritius Ltd 

All Other investments are based in  Port Louis, Mauritius.

Ownership 
The stock of MCB Group is listed on the SEM. As at March 31, 2020, shareholding in the group’s stock was as depicted in the table below:

Governance 
MCB is governed by a twelve-person board of directors with Pierre Guy Noel as the group chief executive officer.

See also 
 Mauritius Commercial Bank
 Banque Française Commerciale Océan Indien 
 Société Générale
 Stock Exchange of Mauritius
 Bank of Mauritius

References 

Companies listed on the Stock Exchange of Mauritius
Companies based in Port Louis
2013 establishments in Mauritius
Holding companies established in 2013
Holding companies of Mauritius
Financial services companies of Mauritius